Xenophobe is a video game developed Bally Midway and released in arcades in 1987. Starbases, moons, ships, and space cities are infested with aliens, and the players have to kill the aliens before each is completely overrun. The screen is split into three horizontally-scrolling windows, one for each of up to three players, yet all players are in the same game world.

Gameplay

The goal of each level is to defeat all the aliens before time runs out. Some rooms routinely display the percentage of alien infection and time remaining until self-destruct when the level ends (but a nearby button can temporarily deactivate the count-down). Levels may contain more than one floor, and players use elevators (and sometimes holes in the floor) to move between floors to defeat all of the aliens. Players can also pick up more powerful weapons and other items to help in their eradication of the aliens.

The hostile aliens (known as "Xenos") come in different forms. If "Eggs" hatch, they create a "Critter" which can attach itself to the player and drain health. If a Critter is not killed, it eventually matures into a "Roller". Rollers are one of the tougher enemies, as they can ball themselves up and roll around while impervious to the players' guns. Rollers sometimes grow into the "Warrior" form, which attacks by leaping and requires multiple hits to kill from most weapons. Warriors are able to spit damaging acid across rooms. This acid also drips from the ceiling in some rooms. They also have a devastating leap attack that will knock down and disarm. One of the more insidious attacks in a Warrior's arsenal is its ability to disarm a player. Simply walking past a Warrior can cause the player's gun to drop to the floor. Other Xenos include "Tentacles" that randomly appear from the deck or ceiling, and trap or strangle the player respectively, and the "Queen" which appears either in doorways or behind certain backgrounds and throws proto-eggs at the players and shoots hypnotic eye beams which trap players and drain their health. If the proto-egg lands on a screen with a player, it grows into another Egg.

As players go through the various maps, they encounter various items to be picked up. Some are only for bonus points at the end of the level, while others are immediately useful to the players. Still other items are useful in the right room. Items collected are counted, and bonus points awarded for each collected. The player collects "credits", each of which gives the player a certain amount of health, which counts down even without combat. Food and some rooms replenish a player's health. The game cycles through levels, increasing the difficulty each cycle, until all players die and no one continues. It is entirely possible to do well enough to continue playing without adding more credits.

Characters
There are nine characters to choose from in Xenophobe, three for each joystick. The leftmost controller (red) offers Mr. M.Brace, Dr. Kwack, and Col. Poupon. The middle controller (yellow) offers Mr. Fogg, Col F. Truth, and Dr. Udderbay. The right controller (blue) offers Mr. Eeez, Dr. Zordirz, and Col. Schickn. Humans and aliens alike make up the playable characters—for instance, Dr. Kwack has a duck's head. Players are also color-coded; for instance, the left player's choices wear red shirts, middle player's yellow, right player's blue.

Ports

Atari Corporation published Xenophobe for the Atari 2600, Atari 7800, Atari ST, and the Lynx. The 7800 port was by BlueSky Software, and the Lynx version by Epyx. An Atari 8-bit family port was worked on, but not published.

Sunsoft ported Xenophobe to the NES. The Commodore 64 port was done by Microplay. The game was also released for the Amiga, Amstrad CPC, and ZX Spectrum.

Reception

Atari Lynx
In a capsule review of the Lynx version for STart, Clayton Walnum commented, "The graphics in some rooms are more detailed than in others, and in general, aren't as impressive as those in ElectroCop, a similar game. Also, the complicated controls take some getting used to." Julian Rignall reviewed the game in the January 1991 issue of CVG Magazine. He went on to say "the graphics and sound are both excellent" with "the gameplay is challenging and addictive". "A fun game which offers plenty of entertainment," giving a final rating of 79 out of 100.

Les Ellis of Raze Magazine also reviewed the game for the Atari Lynx calling it an addictive game with excellent graphics, giving a score of 94%. Robert A. Jung review was published to IGN, in it he wrote that Xenophobe was "arguably more fun than its arcade inspiration." Giving a final score of 8 out of 10.

Legacy
In 2004 Xenophobe was included in Midway's Arcade Treasures 2 for the PS2, Xbox, and GameCube. In 2005, Xenophobe was included in Midway Arcade Treasures: Extended Play on the PSP. In 2012, it was included in Midway Arcade Origins for the PlayStation 3 and Xbox 360.

References

External links

Xenophobe for the Atari ST at Atari Mania

1987 video games
Amiga games
Amstrad CPC games
Arcade video games
Atari 2600 games
Atari 7800 games
Atari Lynx games
Atari ST games
Cancelled Atari 8-bit family games
Commodore 64 games
Cooperative video games
Epyx games
MicroProse games
Midway video games
Multiplayer and single-player video games
Nintendo Entertainment System games
Run and gun games
Science fiction video games
Split-screen multiplayer games
Sunsoft games
Video games developed in Japan
Video games developed in the United States
Video games featuring female protagonists
Video games scored by Barry Leitch
ZX Spectrum games